József Ficsor (born 29 July 1965) is a Hungarian athlete. He competed in the men's discus throw at the 1992 Summer Olympics.

References

1965 births
Living people
Athletes (track and field) at the 1992 Summer Olympics
Hungarian male discus throwers
Olympic athletes of Hungary
Place of birth missing (living people)
20th-century Hungarian people